FabricLive.52 is a 2010 DJ mix album by Zero T. The album was released as part of the FabricLive Mix Series.

Track listing
  Paradox - A Certain Sound (Alaska & Paradox Lost DAT Mix) - Paradox
  Kabuki ft. Jeru the Damaja - Watch your Step (Need for Mirrors VIP Mix) - V
  Ulterior Motive - Seven Segments - Unreleased
  Slam - Positive Education (Zero T Remix) - Soma
  Lynx & Kemo - You are being Lied To - Detail
  Icicle - Ocular - Shogun Audio
  Zero T ft. Script - Guessing Games - Footprints
  System - Speed of Light - Footprints
  Lemonde - Heaven - Valve
  Jubei - Distrust - Shogun Audio
  Break - Wine - Symmetry
  All Thieves - Stars (Zero T Remix) - Footprints
  Need for Mirrors - Sick in the Head - Footprints
  Rockwell - Everything (& U) - Darkestral
  Artificial Intelligence & Krust - Audio Assault - V
  Fracture & Neptune - The Limit - Astrophonica
  Dillinja - When Love - Valve
  Zero T ft. Steo - Walk Away (Zero T Reprint) - CIA
  Genotype - Dubsoca - Unreleased
  Commix - Japanese Electronics (Instra:mental Remix) - Metalheadz
  SP:MC & Joker D - Down - Unreleased
  Icicle - Xylophobia - Shogun Audio
  Compound One - Pum Pum Beat - Compound One
  Sia - Little Man (Exemen Remix) - Long Lost Brother
  Ation - Missing You - Unreleased
  Equinox - Space Dub - Scientific Wax
  Marcus Intalex - 21 - Soul:r
  Calibre - Reach - Unreleased
  Reds ft. Tehbis & Fee Lups - Green Lanes - Footprints

References

External links
Fabric: FabricLive.52

Fabric (club) albums
2010 compilation albums